Bernadett Anita Németh (born 6 September 1996) is a Hungarian ice hockey player and member of the Hungarian national ice hockey team, currently playing in the European Women's Hockey League (EWHL) with the women's team of MAC Budapest.

Playing career 
Németh has represented Hungary at nine IIHF World Women's Championships – twice at the Division II A level, three times at the Division I B level, three times at the Division I A level, and at the Top Division tournament in 2021. With the Hungarian national under-18 team, she participated in the Top Division tournaments of the IIHF Women's U18 World Championships in 2013 and 2014, and in the Division I tournament in 2012, as well as the qualification for the 2012 Division I tournament.

She was named Women's Hockey Player of the Year by the Hungarian Ice Hockey Federation in 2017.

Personal life 
Németh's twin sister, Anikó, is an ice hockey goaltender and also plays with the Hungarian national team and MAC Budapest.

Career statistics

International 

Source(s):

References

External links 
 

1996 births
Living people
Hungarian expatriate sportspeople in Sweden
Hungarian women's ice hockey defencemen
Ice hockey people from Budapest
KMH Budapest (women) players
MAC Budapest (women) players
Swedish Women's Hockey League players
Hungarian twins
Twin sportspeople
European Women's Hockey League players